Shabunda Airport  is an airport serving the town of Shabunda in Sud-Kivu Province, Democratic Republic of the Congo. The runway is centered within the town, which is within a loop of the Ulindi river.

See also

 List of airports in the Democratic Republic of the Congo

References

 OurAirports - Shabunda
 Shabunda
 Great Circle Mapper - Shabunda

External links
 HERE Maps - Shabunda

Airports in South Kivu